Geigelstein is a mountain in Bavaria, Germanywith an elevation of 1,808 meters. It is a mountain within the Chiemgau Alps.

Mountains of Bavaria
Chiemgau Alps
One-thousanders of Germany
Mountains of the Alps